Let  be the Weyl group of a semisimple Lie algebra  (associate to fixed choice of a Cartan subalgebra ).

The affine action (also called the dot action) of the Weyl group on the space  is

where  is the sum of all fundamental weights, or, equivalently, the half of the sum of all positive roots.

References
 .

Representation theory of Lie algebras